Edmond Mansoor is an Antiguan and Barbudan politician and physician. He is former senate president of the Upper House of Parliament in Antigua and Barbuda. He has also served as the Minister of State and Minister of Communication and Telecommunications.

Career 
Mansoor was appointed into the Antiguana and Barbudan senate in 2004 by Prime Minister Baldwin Spencer. Mansoor served as President of the Upper House of Parliament in Antigua and Barbuda between 26 March 2004 to 5 January 2005 after which he was appointed Minister of State. In 2005, he was appointed a Minister in the Office of the Prime Minister, charged with Broadcasting, Information and Telecommunications. He served as Minister of State till June 2014.

References 

Living people
Antigua and Barbuda politicians
Presidents of the Senate (Antigua and Barbuda)
Members of the Senate (Antigua and Barbuda)
Government ministers of Antigua and Barbuda
United Progressive Party (Antigua and Barbuda) politicians
Year of birth missing (living people)